In South Africa, there are two main branches of legal practitioner: attorneys, who do legal work of all kinds, and advocates,  who are specialists litigators. Attorneys may form professional firms and practice in partnerships, ranging in size to the "Big Five" law firms. The profession is regulated by the Attorneys Act, 1979 (Act No. 53 of 1979). See: Advocates in South Africa. There are currently around 21400 attorneys and 5000 candidate attorneys in South Africa, each of which are represented by the LSSA (Law Society of South Africa)

Training

For admission as an attorney, the academic qualification required is an LLB from a South African university; see  and Legal education in South Africa. (Historically, the B.Proc. degree was also offered.) One then serves "articles" as a candidate attorney with a practicing attorney for a period specified according to the qualification of the candidate (generally two years if an appropriate legal degree has been obtained); the length of articles may be reduced by attending a practical legal training course or performing community service. The candidate must also write a "board exam" set by the relevant provincial Law Society. The examination comprises the following:
Paper 1: Practice and procedure (criminal procedure, supreme court procedure, magistrates’ court procedure and motor vehicle accident claims);
Paper 2: Wills and Estates;
Paper 3: Attorneys’ practice, contracts and rules of conduct;
Paper 4: Legal bookkeeping.

Attorneys may additionally qualify as Notaries and Conveyancers, via the Conveyancing and Notarial Practice Examinations; those with technical or scientific training may further qualify as patent attorneys, see  §South Africa there.

Although not formally required for practice, further training, e.g. in tax, is usually via specialised postgraduate diplomas or LL.M. programmes. See .

LSSA

The LSSA (Law Society of South Africa) consists of the regulatory and disciplinary bodies for practising attorneys in South Africa. Attorneys are required to register at the relative provincial law society where they practice in terms of the Attorneys Act, 1979.

Attorneys and Advocates

Attorneys are engaged directly by clients, acting as the “manager” of litigious cases.  Although both attorneys and advocates may appear in the High Court of South Africa, they will 'brief' an advocate when specialist litigation, is required.

The split between attorney and advocate in South Africa mirrors the split between solicitor and barrister in other Commonwealth countries, with attorneys having broadly equivalent roles to solicitors and advocates having broadly equivalent roles to barristers.

References

Region-specific legal occupations
Law of South Africa
South African lawyers